The 2000 WNBA season was the first season for the Seattle Storm.

Offseason

Expansion Draft

WNBA Draft

Regular season

Season standings

Season Schedule

Player stats
Note: GP= Games played; REB= Rebounds; AST= Assists; STL = Steals; BLK = Blocks; PTS = Points; AVG = Average

References

External links
Storm on Basketball Reference

Seattle Storm seasons
Seattle
2000 in sports in Washington (state)